Gaspare Cenci was a Roman Catholic prelate who served as Bishop of Melfi e Rapolla (1574–1590).

Biography
On 8 January 1574, Gaspare Cenci was appointed during the papacy of Pope Gregory XIII as Bishop of Melfi e Rapolla. On 12 Mar 1574, he was consecrated bishop by Giulio Antonio Santorio, Cardinal-Priest of San Bartolomeo all'Isola, with Giovanni Battista Santorio, Bishop of Alife, and Giuseppe Pamphilj, Bishop of Segni, serving as co-consecrators. He served as Bishop of Melfi e Rapolla until his resignation in 1590.

Episcopal succession

See also
Catholic Church in Italy

References

External links and additional sources
 (for Chronology of Bishops) 
 (for Chronology of Bishops) 

16th-century Italian Roman Catholic bishops
Bishops appointed by Pope Gregory XIII